Lost Lake is a lake located in Whistler, British Columbia, Canada. The area around it, Lost Lake Park, is part of the municipal park system's cross-country skiing trails and, until hotel development overshadowed views of the park's swimming docks, was Whistler's long-time nude sunbathing beach. It has multiple public docks, which can be accessed by swimming in warmer months.

See also
Alta Lake
Green Lake
 Thetis Lake
Wreck Beach

Notes

Whistler, British Columbia
Lakes of British Columbia
Nude beaches
New Westminster Land District